Komendantsky Prospekt, literally translate - Avenue of Commendants ) is a station on the Frunzensko-Primorskaya Line of the Saint Petersburg Metro, opened on April 2, 2005. Its main decoration theme depicts the early years of Russian aviation, due to the location of the station at a former aviation field. It is the newest fourth metro station of the over-populated Primorsky district of Saint Petersburg, along with Pionerskaya and Chornaya Rechka stations of the Moskovsko-Petrogradskaya line and Staraya Derevnya of the Frunzensko-Primorskaya line.

Transport 
Buses: 112, 125, 126, 127, 127M, 134Б, 135, 170, 171, 172, 180, 182, 194, 223, 235, 258, 279, 294. Trolleybuses: 2, 23, 25, 50. Trams: 47, 55.

Saint Petersburg Metro stations
Railway stations in Russia opened in 2005
Railway stations located underground in Russia